St. Joseph's College of Commerce (SJCC) is a Bengaluru City University-affiliated college operated by the Jesuits. It is autonomous and has an independent examination and recognition system. It is situated in central Bangalore at Brigade Road.

History
The college traces its history to 1882, when the Missions Etrangeres' de Paris established St Joseph's European High School.  Its operations were handed to the Jesuits in 1937 and the Department of Commerce created in 1949. In 1972 St. Joseph's College was divided, with its College of Arts and Sciences and its College of Commerce becoming independent, although both remain under the administration of the Bangalore Jesuit Educational Society. St Joseph's College of Commerce (SJCC) and St Joseph's College of Business Administration (SJCBA) moved to 163, Brigade Road, and St Joseph's Evening College became an independent college.

In 1996 SJCBA started offering two-year, full-time Postgraduate Diploma in Management (PGDM) with recognition from All India Council for Technical Education (AICTE), Govt Of India. By an order of the government Karnataka, the pre-university sections from both St Joseph's College of Arts & Science and St Joseph's College of Commerce were bifurcated to form into one junior College, St. Joseph's Pre-University College.

In 2014 SJCBA signed a MoU to cooperate with the global body of professional accountants ACCA in offering a joint BCom program.

Student life

Intercollegiate fests conducted annually:
 Spiel - Sports Fest
 Dhwani - Cultural Fest
 Virtuoso - Business Fest For BBM Students
 Chanakya - Business Fest for BCom students
 Kalarava - Kannada Language Fest
 Turas - Travel & Tourism Fest featuring a myriad of events
 CIPHER- Intra-college business fest
 Kalotsav - Intra-college cultural fest

Notable alumni

 Rahul Dravid, cricket player and coach
 T.V. Mohandas Pai, Chairman of Manipal Global Education 
 
 Shivil Kaushik, cricketer, Gujarat Lions
 Noyonita Lodh, Miss Diva Universe 2014
 Prakash Raj, actor
 Ramya, actress and politician
 Vinay Rajkumar, actor
 Amritha Aiyer, actress
 Salil Shetty, Secretary-General of Amnesty International
 Devdutt Padikkal, Cricket Player

See also
 List of Jesuit sites
St Joseph's Institute of Management

References

External links
 SJCC official website

Colleges in Bangalore
Jesuit universities and colleges in India
Educational institutions established in 1972
Commerce colleges in India
1972 establishments in Mysore State